Simon Wills (born 3 October 1976 in Auckland, New Zealand) is a former racing driver who currently runs a graphic design business.

Racing career

Formula cars
Wills finished runner up in the 1995 New Zealand Formula Ford Championship.  He had gained a large lead in the series, but left the championship two races early to attempt to launch a career in Europe. He won Class B of the British Formula 3 Championship in 1996. However, he didn't have the finances to continue his career in Europe and decided to focus on racing in Australia and New Zealand.

Wills won the 1998 and 1999 New Zealand Grands Prix. He was the Australian Drivers' Champion (Formula Holden) in both 1999 and 2000, and New Zealand Gold Star Champion for 1998 and 1999, including winning the 1999 Tasman Cup. He also holds, or has held, the outright lap record at several tracks, including the Phillip Island Grand Prix Circuit, Hidden Valley Raceway, Pukekohe Park Raceway, Manfeild Autocourse, Canberra Street Circuit and Queensland Raceway, which were all set in a Reynard 94D.

Touring cars
Wills won the Konica V8 Supercar Series in 2001. In the main V8 Supercar series, he also competed in nine Bathurst 1000s, debuting with Gibson Motorsport in 1998, and finishing in 2007 with Brad Jones Racing. Wills also held the lap record of the Mount Panorama Circuit in Bathurst between the 2001 and 2002 races, having set the lap record during the 2001 Bathurst 1000. Following Bathurst in 2001, Wills completed the remaining rounds in the 2001 season with Briggs Motor Sport, and then drove full-time from 2003 to 2005 with Team Dynamik. In 2007, he drove the bulk of the rounds with Brad Jones Racing after team owner and lead driver Brad Jones retired mid-season.

Wills' most significant achievement in V8 Supercar was winning the 2002 Queensland 500 endurance race for Stone Brothers Racing, co-driving with David Besnard. Wills went close to going back to back at the Bathurst lead-up event, with co-driver Jason Richards going off late in the 2003 Betta Electrical Sandown 500 while attempting to overtake Mark Skaife for the lead. Wills was also the driver when Team Dynamik infamously ran a test session on an airfield near Woomera, South Australia in 2004, which resulted in significant penalties for the team.

Career results

Bathurst 1000 results

Business
In the latter years of his racing career, Wills launched a graphic design and signwriting business in Adelaide, South Australia. Formed with his wife, Sinch Creative focuses on motor racing designs amongst other areas.

References

External links
 

1976 births
Living people
Formula Ford drivers
Formula Holden drivers
New Zealand racing drivers
Sportspeople from Auckland
Supercars Championship drivers